Zbigniew Czech (20 April 1909 – 4 August 1973) was a Polish painter. His work was part of the painting event in the art competition at the 1932 Summer Olympics.

References

1909 births
1973 deaths
20th-century Polish painters
20th-century Polish male artists
Olympic competitors in art competitions
People from Ciechanów
Polish male painters